Fiorella Viñas (born c. 1984) is the 2006 Miss Peru. She represented the Peruvian region of Lambayeque and won the title of Miss Peru Universe. She competed at the Miss Universe 2006 pageant held on 23 July 2006 in Los Angeles, California where she didn't place as a finalist.

External links
 Fiorella Viñas Official Site

Living people
People from Chiclayo
Miss Universe 2006 contestants
Peruvian female models
1984 births
Peruvian beauty pageant winners
Peruvian child models